An election for the leadership of the Saskatchewan New Democratic Party was held on June 26, 2022 in Regina, Saskatchewan as a result of the resignation of Ryan Meili. 7,294 party members were eligible to vote, although only 4,741 cast their ballot. Carla Beck became the party's first elected female leader, winning the leadership vote with 3,244 votes cast – around 68 percent – while her opponent, Kaitlyn Harvey, received around 32 percent of votes with 1,492 cast in her name.

Rules
All Saskatchewan New Democratic Party members in good standing were eligible to vote online, by mail-in ballot, or in person at the convention.

Timeline
October 26, 2020: the NDP loses the 2020 general election to the Saskatchewan Party.
February 15, 2022: NDP candidate Georgina Jolibois loses the 2022 Athabasca provincial by-election.
February 18, 2022: Ryan Meili announces his resignation as leader. He chose to remain in the position until a new leader is chosen.
February 28, 2022: a leadership election is announced for June 2022.
March 3, 2022: Carla Beck announces her leadership campaign.
April 5, 2022: Kaitlyn Harvey announces her leadership campaign.
June 26, 2022: Carla Beck is elected as the new leader of the Saskatchewan NDP.

Candidates

Carla Beck
Background
Carla Beck is the MLA for Regina Lakeview (2016–present).
Candidacy announced: March 3, 2022
Campaign website: carlaforleader.ca

Kaitlyn Harvey
Background
Kaitlyn Harvey was the NDP candidate for Saskatoon Willowgrove in 2020. She had sought the nomination in Saskatoon Meewasin, the seat of outgoing leader Meili, but revoked her candidacy in July 2022.
Candidacy announced: April 5, 2022
Campaign website: https://www.changestartshere.ca

Declined
 Jennifer Bowes, MLA for Saskatoon University (2020–present); endorsed Harvey
Charlie Clark, Mayor of Saskatoon (2016–present) 
 Meara Conway, MLA for Regina Elphinstone-Centre (2020–present)
Betty Nippi-Albright, MLA for Saskatoon Centre (2020–present); endorsed Beck
Nicole Sarauer, MLA for Regina Douglas Park (2016–present); endorsed Beck
Trent Wotherspoon, MLA for Regina Rosemont (2007–present); endorsed Beck
Aleana Young, MLA for Regina University (2020–present); endorsed Beck

See also
Leadership convention

References

External links

Saskatchewan New Democratic Party leadership elections
Saskatchewan
New Democratic
Saskatchewan New Democratic Party leadership election